Yves Duteil (born 24 July 1949, in Neuilly-sur-Seine, Hauts-de-Seine) is a French singer-songwriter. He is the third child to be born in the family. Duteil is a noted proponent of the French language, the rights of children and the respect of environment. Duteil was the mayor of Précy-sur-Marne in Seine et Marne from 1989 to 2014.

Recordings 
In 1972, Yves Duteil had first minor hit with a song called "Virages". Included on his 1974 debut album L'Écritoire, it shares fame with such songs as the title track and from his next album, "J'attends" (1976), "Tisserand", "Les Batignolles" (an area of Paris), etc.

His 1977 album "Tarentelle", which would become his most classic, included not only his most famous song ("Prendre un Enfant") but also such songs as the title track, "Le Petit Pont de Bois", "Le Mur De La Prison D'En Face" which have all become classics.

Duteil's ability to write love-filled, touching lyrics on sweet or catchy melodies have made him a singer much more loved than he is adulated by the public. He is probably not the first one to have achieved to stay outside of the show business spirit while managing to be very popular, after all Hugues Aufray did this too. But this is probably a touching side to know the man lives the simple life of a husband and father, doing concerts which are closer to a friendly grouping where pure emotions are shared.

In 2001, Duteil released "Sans Attendre", more introspective than ever and with much modesty, he tackles some aspects of his life in a way that can bring a deep sight on life, understood in the light of spiritual love. In a simple way, he sings about friendship in tough times ("Les Gestes Délicats"), compassion for a father who never showed him that much affection, which never prevents Duteil to answer with love and sings all the kind words he found to his father, no matter what his childhood was like ("Lettre À Mon Père"). And probably the most touching song: "Pour Que Tu Ne Meures Pas", which, for those who understand the lyrics, will bring tears of emotion as it deals with Yves Duteil's wife's disease, still in a very modest way and which brings a deep joy and belief in life and love as so much love is contained in this song. This is probably one of the most love filled, hope filled recording he has made. And leaves us, at the end of the listening, with a smile of joy and thankfulness that life is such a wonderful gift.

In Germany songs of Duteil are interpreted in French and German language by the Belgo-German singer Didier Caesar of the quartet Stéphane & Didier et Cie, who has translated in German the songs "La tarentelle" (Die Tarantella), "La puce et le pianiste" (Der Floh und der Pianist), "Lucile et les libelulles" (Sibyll und die Libellen), "Il me manquait toujours" (Es fehlt mir immer noch) and "Prendre un enfant par la main" (Nimm ein Kind an deine Hand). This song had been translated and sung in 2001 by the famous German Liedermacher Reinhard Mey with his title "Gib einem Kind deine Hand". The German song texts can be found on website www.deutsche-chanson-texte.de. Duteil has written a total of 208 songs to current date.

Discography 
 1972: Virages (single)
 1974: L'écritoire
 1976: J'attends
 1977: Tarentelle
 1978: En public au théâtre des Champs-Elysées
 1979: Mélancolie (retitled J'ai la guitare)
 1980: Yves Duteil chante pour les enfants
 1981: Ça n'est pas ce qu'on fait qui compte
 1982: L'Olympia
 1982: Les saisons Grand-Père, disc-book
 1983: La statue d'ivoire
 1985: La langue de chez nous
 1985: L'univers musical Jean Musy – instrumental
 1987: Ton absence
 1988: Côté scène – Olympia
 1990: Blessures d'enfance
 1991: En public – spectacle au Zénith
 1992: Vos préférences , compilation
 1992: La fleur de l'impossible – Alberville
 1993: Ligne de vie
 1994: Entre elles et moi – duos
 1996: Pour les enfants , compilation
 1997: Touché
 1997: Correspondences, 4-CD compilation
 2001: Sans attendre
 2002: Yves Duteil chante les enfants
 2003: Yves Duteil chante pour elle
 2003: Yves Duteil par cœur
 2004: Tous les droits des enfants
 2004: Yves Duteil chante l'air des mots
 2008: (fr)agiles
 2010: Mes escales..., 2-CD compilation
2012: Fragrant délice
2013: Prendre un enfant
2018: Respect

Bibliography 
 Les mots qu'on n'a pas dits
 1998: Ma France buissonnière
 Livre blanc pour y voir plus vert dans les forêts
 Dans l'air des mots – 30 ans de chansons en images

References

External links 
 Official website

1949 births
Living people
People from Neuilly-sur-Seine
French male singers
French singer-songwriters
French people of Jewish descent
Pathé-Marconi artists
French male singer-songwriters